The University of South Carolina (USC, South Carolina, or Carolina) is a public research university in Columbia, South Carolina. It is the flagship of the University of South Carolina System and the largest university in the state by enrollment. The university is classified among "R1: Doctoral Universities with Highest Research Activity". It houses the largest collection of Robert Burns and Scottish literature materials outside Scotland and the world's largest Ernest Hemingway collection.

Founded in 1801 as South Carolina College, USC now offers more than 350 programs of study, leading to bachelor's, master's, and doctoral degrees from 14 degree-granting colleges and schools. The university system has a total enrollment of approximately 52,000 students, with over 35,000 on the Columbia research campus as of fall 2019, making it the largest university in South Carolina. USC also has several thousand future students in feeder programs at surrounding technical colleges. Professional schools on the Columbia campus include business, engineering, law, medicine, pharmacy, and social work.

History

Foundation and early history
The university was founded as South Carolina College on December 19, 1801, by an act of the South Carolina General Assembly initiated by Governor John Drayton in an effort to promote harmony between the Lowcountry and the Backcountry. On January 10, 1805, having an initial enrollment of nine students, the college commenced classes with a traditional classical curriculum. The first president was the Baptist minister and theologian Reverend Jonathan Maxcy. He was an alumnus of Brown University, with an honorary degree from Harvard University. Before coming to the college, Maxcy had served as the second president of Brown and the third president of Union College. Maxcy's tenure lasted from 1804 through 1820.

When South Carolina College opened its doors in 1805, the building now known as Rutledge College was the only building on campus. Located one block southeast of the State Capitol, it served as an administrative office, academic building, residence hall, and chapel. However, the master plan for the original campus called for a total of eleven buildings, all facing a large lush gathering area. In 1807, the original President's House was the next building to be erected. The building now known as DeSaussure College followed shortly thereafter, and the remaining eight buildings were constructed over the next several decades. When completed, all eleven buildings formed a U-shape open to Sumter Street. This modified quadrangle became known as the Horseshoe.

As with other southern universities in the antebellum period, the most important organizations for students were the two literary societies, the Clariosophic Society and the Euphradian Society. These two societies, which arose from a split in an earlier literary society known as the Philomathic, grew to encapsulate the majority of the student body from the 1820s onward.

The college became a symbol of the South in the antebellum period as its graduates were on the forefront of secession from the Union. With the generous support of the General Assembly, South Carolina College acquired a reputation as the leading institution of the South and attracted several noteworthy scholars, including Francis Lieber, Thomas Cooper, and Joseph LeConte.

Slavery and slave labor played a fundamental role in the foundation and construction of the University of South Carolina. Many of the primary buildings in the central heart of campus, known today as the horseshoe, were built not only by slave labor but also of slave-made brick. Slave labor played a large role in the maintenance operational duties of early campus activities. This includes maintenance, cleaning of student tenements and faculty duplexes, and the preparation of meals.

Civil War and reconstruction
Seventy-two students were present for classes in January 1862 and the college functioned until a call by the Confederate government for South Carolina to fill its quota of 18,000 soldiers. A system of conscription began on March 20 for all men between the ages of 18 and 45, but many students volunteered. With the depletion of students, professors issued a notice that the college would open to those under 18 years old. Nine students showed up for class.

The University Act of 1869 reorganized the university and provided it with generous financial support. An amendment was added to the act by W. J. Whipper, a black representative from Beaufort, that would prevent racial discrimination from the admissions policy of the university. The legislature further proved its seriousness towards racial equality by electing two black trustees, Benjamin A. Bozeman and Francis Lewis Cardozo, to the governing board of the university on March 9, 1869. A normal school was established by the legislature on the campus of the university as well as a preparatory school for black students, since most former slaves were ill-prepared for academic work. In addition, to encourage enrollment by blacks, tuition and other fees were abolished. On October 7, 1873, Henry E. Hayne, the Secretary of State of South Carolina, became the first black student when he registered for the fall session in the medical college of the university.

Previous institution names

 Chartered as South Carolina College on December 19, 1801
 Chartered as the University of South Carolina on January 10, 1866
 Chartered as South Carolina College of Agriculture and Mechanics on October 3, 1880
 Chartered as South Carolina College in 1882
 Chartered as the University of South Carolina on May 9, 1888
 Chartered as South Carolina College on April 21, 1890
 Chartered as the University of South Carolina on February 17, 1906

Campus
 The Horseshoe is listed on the National Register of Historic Places, and most of its buildings reflect the federal style of architecture in vogue in the early days of the nation. Among them is the South Caroliniana Library, which was designed by Robert Mills and is the first freestanding academic library in the United States.

Over the years the 11 original buildings on the Horseshoe survived a fire, an earthquake, and the Civil War, but in 1939 McKissick Museum replaced the original President's House. The President's House would eventually return to the Horseshoe after extensive remodeling of one of its original buildings, which was dedicated as such in 1952.

During the 20th century: the campus began to spread out dramatically from the Horseshoe. Today it includes the student union, 24 residence halls, numerous academic buildings, Longstreet Theatre, the Koger Center for the Arts, the Carolina Coliseum, the Colonial Life Arena, Carolina Stadium, and various facilities for Olympic sports. (Williams-Brice Stadium is located approximately one mile off campus.) Recent additions to the campus are the Strom Thurmond Wellness and Fitness Center, the Greek Village, the Green Quad, the Honors College Residence Hall, the Public Health Research Center, the Graduate Columbia hotel, the Colonial Life Arena and Carolina Stadium. In, 2017, a new School of Law building opened on Senate Street, and the Darla Moore School of Business opened its new home at the corner of Assembly and Greene in 2014.

The campus continues to expand west toward the Congaree River in support of its research initiatives (see below). This new district of campus, named Innovista, will mix university and private research buildings, parking garages, and commercial and residential units. At the center will be a public plaza called Foundation Square.

The University of South Carolina also operates a transit system under Parking Services called Carolina Shuttle which operates 7 routes and 14 buses including converted buses that use more energy-efficient biodiesel. The system operates during the Fall and Spring semesters, with limited operation during the summer, reading days, and holidays. Service is free for the university's students, faculty and staff. A new system called "Cocky's Caravan" was added in 2008 as a weekend service, shuttling students from main areas on campus to the local entertainment district Five Points. In 2011, Cocky's Caravan was shut down and replaced by a partnership with Checker Yellow Cab known as "Carolina Cab" that offers students free rides from Five Points to their homes within  of campus.

South Carolina Japanese Language Supplementary School/Matsuba Gakuen, a weekend supplementary school for Japanese children, is held on the campus of this university as of 1989.

Academics

Undergraduate admissions

Undergraduate admissions are classified as more selective. When admitting freshmen, the university puts emphasis on the rigor of high school study and scores on standardized test, SAT or ACT. It also considers class rank, extracurricular activities, and an optional personal statement. For the freshman enrollment of 2022, half the class had SAT scores between 1150–1360, or ACT scores between 26–31.

South Carolina Honors College
Founded in 1978, the South Carolina Honors College offers support to academically gifted undergraduate students. After gaining acceptance to the University of South Carolina, students must apply separately to the Honors College and demonstrate significant academic achievement. In 2019, entering freshmen had an average weighted GPA of 4.71 and a midrange SAT score (critical reading and math) of 1460–1530.

Rankings

Research
The University of South Carolina is classified as a research institution of "very high research activity". The university was awarded $278.6 million in research funding in the 2019 fiscal year, a record amount for the school and an increase of 8% over the year prior.

During his tenure as president of the University of South Carolina, John Palms articulated a "Cathedrals of Excellence" budgeting philosophy. Palms advocated the money from fundraising be channeled into the school's best programs, rather than spread the funds evenly. The strategy would pay off in the long term when these programs became nationally prominent, making a name for the University of South Carolina and attracting grant money. His primary goal was for the university to be admitted to the Association of American Universities – an association of the leading 62 research universities in the United States and Canada.

Former President Andrew Sorensen raised even larger sums for research, including a $300 million grant for colorectal cancer. In the spirit of Palms' budget, the board of directors moved to transform university land on Assembly Street into an "innovation district" called Innovista that will develop four areas: biomedicine, nanotechnology, environmental science and alternative fuels.

Innovista is a partnered development with the City of Columbia. The  campus will house offices and private research firms among the university offices and labs, as well as residences and retail. Innovista is planned to add five million square feet of floor space to the metro area and is intended to set Columbia on a more urban path.

In May 2009, the University of South Carolina was selected by the U.S. Department of Energy as one of 31 universities nationwide to house an Energy Frontier Research Center that is expected to bring $12.5 million in federal funding, the largest single award in the university's history, to the College of Engineering and Computing. President Pastides commented on the grant, "This award solidifies the university's position as a leader in alternative-fuel research."

The University of South Carolina is a member of the SEC Academic Consortium. Now renamed the SECU, the initiative was a collaborative endeavor designed to promote research, scholarship and achievement amongst the member universities in the Southeastern conference. The SECU formed its mission to serve as a means to bolster collaborative academic endeavors of Southeastern Conference universities. Its goals include highlighting the endeavors and achievements of SEC faculty, students and its universities and advancing the academic reputation of SEC universities.

Student life

Demographics
Over 34,500  students attend the Columbia campus of the University of South Carolina, coming from all 46 South Carolina counties. In addition, students from all 50 states and more than 100 foreign countries are represented here. (Almost 16,000 students study at the regional campuses of the University of South Carolina System.)

Housing

The University of South Carolina campus is home to 25 residence halls; the most recently completed hall opened in the fall of 2011. The housing on campus is under the supervision of Department of Student Housing.

University Housing provides over 6,200 on-campus housing units. Rent includes all utilities. Freshman Centers typically feature double rooms and a central bathroom on each floor per unit. Notable freshmen centers include the 11-story Columbia Hall, 10-story Bates House and Patterson Hall, as well as South Tower which has 18 floors. Apartment style units in the modern housing units, which are often referred to as the "Quads", are the most requested type of housing among upper-level students. All are air-conditioned featuring two-, three-, and four-private bedroom floor plans with a living/dining area, kitchen, and bath. Undergraduates may choose housing in a specific "living and learning community". The concept is to create a better social and learning environment by housing students with similar academic or career interests together. Learning communities enhance students' living experience by providing active learning experiences, faculty-student interactions, and opportunities to explore diversity, community service, undergraduate research, and study abroad; some of these centers are the Carolina International House at Maxcy College, Galen Health Fellows, the Rhodos community, Green Quad, Capstone, and Preston Residential College.

Nine-story Patterson Hall, with a capacity of approximately 600 freshmen, is the university's largest residence hall. The tallest and most notable landmark on the Columbia campus is the 18-story Capstone House. Top of Carolina Dining Room is on the 18th floor and was the only revolving restaurant on an American college campus. In the fall of 2004, the $29 million West Quad (now Green Quad) opened and became one of only four in the world to be certified by the U.S. Green Building Council's Leadership in Energy and Environmental Design (LEED) program. The  complex includes three four-story buildings. West Quad, which was built with a significant amount of recycled materials, ranging from the cement blocks and copper roof to the interior carpet, is also intended to encourage students to learn more about their environment.

Since campus academic enrollment exceeds the capacity of on-campus housing, the university is adding more residence halls, most of which will be suite-style. As a result, some students live in popular off-campus housing.

Student government
The university's student government is composed of the executive, judicial, and legislative branches. A 50-member Student Senate is led by the student body speaker of the Senate. The Student Senate enacts referendums, resolutions, and bills to enhance the student body in non-academic fields, maintains a budget for student life programs and organizations, confirms nominations for cabinet positions, and makes recommendations for change within the university. Student government is operated entirely by students with a Constitutional Council (its version of a Supreme Court) and Elections Commission. Authority derives from the Student Government Constitution, a document written and adopted with the inception of student government and overseen by the President of the University of South Carolina and the university's board of trustees.

Organizations
Students may participate in any of the 540 registered student organizations.

Carolina Productions is a student organization responsible for providing diverse educational programs, entertainment, and special events for the university. It is composed of seven commissions, each of which concentrates on separate programming.

Honor societies include Alpha Epsilon Delta, Alpha Kappa Delta, Alpha Lambda Delta, Alpha Phi Sigma, Beta Alpha Psi, Carolina Scholars Association, Chi Sigma Iota, Eta Sigma Delta, Gamma Beta Phi, Golden Key, Kappa Delta Epsilon Society, McNair Scholars Association, Mortar Board, Mu Sigma Rho, National Residence Hall Honorary, National Society of Collegiate Scholars, Omicron Delta Kappa, Order of Omega, Phi Alpha Theta, Phi Beta Kappa, Phi Lambda Sigma, Phi Sigma Pi, Phi Sigma Tau, Pi Tau Sigma, Psi Chi, Rho Chi, Sigma Alpha Lambda, Sigma Delta Pi, Sigma Iota Rho, Tau Sigma, and Tau Beta Pi.

Professional organizations include Kappa Kappa Psi National Band Fraternity, Gamma Iota Sigma, Phi Delta Epsilon, Academy of Student Pharmacists, Alpha Kappa Psi, American Marketing Association, Delta Sigma Pi, Gamecock Pre-Veterinary Association, Global Business Council, Library and Information Science Student Association, Phi Alpha Delta, Phi Delta Epsilon, Public Relations Student Society of America, Social Work Student Association, Men in Nursing, Student Nurses Association, American Society of Civil Engineers, Biomedical Engineering Society, Phi Beta Lambda, Theta Tau, Society of Women Engineers, American Society of Mechanical Engineers, among others.

Religious organizations include Shandon College (Shandon Baptist Church), Canterbury Community (The Episcopal Church), Christian Legal Society, Baptist Collegiate Ministry, Campus Crusade for Christ, Chi Alpha (Assemblies of God), Christ's Student Church (Church of Christ), Hillel (Jewish), Lutheran Campus Ministry, Methodist Student Network, Muslim Students Association, Orthodox Christian Fellowship, Presbyterian (USA) Student Association, The Navigators, Reformed University Fellowship (Presbyterian Church in America), St. Thomas More Catholic Community, InterVarsity Christian Fellowship, Student Christian Fellowship, Saint Theodore's Anglican Chapel, and Kappa Upsilon Chi.

Minority and international student organizations include Association of African American Students, Students Allied for Latin America, Individuals Respecting Identities & Sexualities (IRIS), the Trans Student Alliance (TSA), Black Graduate Student Association, the Latin American Student Organization (LASO), Hellenic Student Organization, NAACP, Brothers of Nubian Descent, Ethnic Student Ministries, Indian Cultural Exchange, Indian Student Association, International Student Association, Nihon Club, Fellowship Association of Chinese Students and Scholars, Taiwanese Students Association, Thai Students Association, Turkish Student Association, Vietnamese Student Association, Filipino-American Student Association, SEED, Secular Student Alliance, Society of Black Engineers, Hindu Students Council, and African-American Male Institute.

Other organizations include choral groups, concert band, the Carolina Debate Union, the Mock Trial Team, dance, drama/theater, jazz band, the Mighty Sound of the Southeast, music ensembles, musical theater, the anime club Nashi (Creators of the annual event Nashi-Con, garnering over 1000 attendees annually to the university), opera, pep band, symphony orchestra, and the campus radio station.

Students can also join the Reserve Officers Training Corps (ROTC) or participate in any of the local projects sponsored by Habitat for Humanity.

Media

The Daily Gamecock is an editorially independent student newspaper founded in 1908 that is published Monday through Friday during the fall and spring semesters and nine times during the summer, with the exception of university holidays and exam periods. It has a readership of more than 30,000 and is distributed across the university campus and regional campuses in the University of South Carolina System.

The student run radio station, WUSC, began broadcasting on the AM dial in 1947. In January 1977 WUSC began broadcasting on the FM dial, and in 1982 the station found its current home at 90.5 FM. In June 2006, WUSC upgraded to a current digital transmitter and are now broadcasting in HD radio. WUSC-FM was one of the first stations in the state to broadcast in HD and recently made history by being the first station in the state to broadcast in HD2.

Students also publish a literary magazine, Garnet & Black, which was formed in 1994 as a consolidation of the university's former yearbook and its literary magazine. The magazine focuses on timely issues and trends of student interest and regularly offering tidbits on current events and a "Create" section showcasing students' literature and artwork. It is published four times a year and is free to students at many locations across the Carolina community.

The University of South Carolina established its first television station in the Fall 2006, Student Government Television (SGTV). It was funded by Student Government until April 2007 when Student Government released SGTV to the Department of Student Media, which also operates The Daily Gamecock, Garnet & Black Magazine and WUSC-FM. It was then that the station changed its name to it current name, Student Gamecock Television (SGTV).

Greek organizations
About 22% of undergraduate men and 34% of undergraduate women participate in Greek organizations. Greek life is governed by an internal body that is called the Greek Council. There are two separate councils, one for males and another for females, that oversee activities and recruitment for fraternities and sororities on campus. The organizations hold two rush classes for the fall and spring semesters. The Greek organizations are heavily involved on campus with community service projects and spirit contests.

The University of South Carolina also has four Musical Greek organizations; Kappa Kappa Psi, Tau Beta Sigma, Phi Mu Alpha, and Sigma Alpha Iota.

There are two service sororities, Epsilon Sigma Alpha and Omega Phi Alpha

There are two service fraternities, Alpha Phi Omega and Epsilon Tau Pi.

There are five co-ed professional fraternities on campus;
 Business: Alpha Kappa Psi, Delta Sigma Pi, and Sigma Omega Upsilon
 Engineering: Theta Tau
 Pre-Medical: Phi Delta Epsilon

The most prominent features of Greek life at the university are the large, mostly Greek Revival style mansions maintained by the national fraternities and sororities as chapter houses. Lining Lincoln Street, Gadsden Street, and Mark Buyck Way are the houses referred to as the Greek Village. All students who live in these residences are members of a sorority or fraternity, and while the properties are managed by the university, each house is privately owned by a fraternity or sorority.

Recreation
Students tend to socialize off campus in Five Points and the Congaree Vista. Both of these areas are within walking distance of campus and offer restaurants, bars, cafés, and a variety of local entertainment.

Lake Murray and the three rivers (Saluda River, Broad River, and Congaree River) around Columbia offer students many recreational activities. The South Carolina coast—Charleston, SC, Myrtle Beach, Hilton Head—is only a 1.5- to 2-hour drive for additional recreational activities.

Athletics

The university offers club, intramural, and varsity sports. Its 19 varsity sports teams compete in the Southeastern Conference (except for men's soccer which competes in the Sun Belt Conference and women's sand volleyball which competes as an independent) and are known as the Gamecocks.

The Gamecocks have won 11 national team championships: 2017 and 2022 NCAA Championship in women's basketball; 2010 and 2011 NCAA Championships in baseball; 2002 NCAA Championship in women's outdoor track and field; 2005, 2007, and 2015 National Championships in women's equestrian; and 2005, 2006, and 2007 Hunt Seat National Championships in women's equestrian. Also, the men's and women's track and field teams have produced many NCAA individual champions, world championship medalists, and Olympic medalists. The baseball and basketball teams have also produced Olympic medalists. Other significant accomplishments include 2010 SEC Eastern Division Champions in football, NCAA runner-up four times in women's track and field (2000, 2001, 2003, 2005), NCAA runner-up four times in baseball (1975, 1977, 2002, 2012), 1993 NCAA runner-up in men's soccer, 2005 and 2006 NIT champions in men's basketball, and the 1980 Heisman Trophy winner George Rogers.

Fight song and alma mater
Notable among a number of songs commonly played and sung at various events such as commencement, convocation, and athletic games are: The Fighting Gamecocks Lead the Way (the University of South Carolina fight song) and We Hail Thee Carolina (the university's alma mater).

Fight song
The university's band director James Pritchard obtained a band arrangement of the Elmer Bernstein-penned song "Step to the Rear" from the Broadway musical How Now, Dow Jones in 1968 and the marching band played the song at the first game of the 1968 season.  It caught the ear of Coach Paul Dietzel who contacted Pritchard about making it the official fight song of the university to replace the original "Carolina Fight Song" (or "Carolina Let Your Voices Ring," now called the "Old Fight Song").  Dietzel wrote the lyrics for the song, but asked that he remain anonymous because knowledge that the football coach wrote the lyrics might render it unacceptable to the basketball program.  The song was officially introduced on November 16, 1968, prior to the football game against Virginia Tech and has been the fight song since the Fall of 1969.

Alma mater
The Gamecock reported in its March 1911 issue that very little progress had been made on the alma mater for the university despite a reward of $50 by the faculty.  English professor, George A. Wauchope, took it upon himself and wrote the lyrics for the alma mater in 1911 set to the tune Flow Gently, Sweet Afton by Robert Burns.  Other songs were written and sung, but Wauchope's song proved to be the most popular and it was adopted by the university in 1912.

The tradition has developed that alumni raise their right hand as though raising a cup for the phrase "Here's A Health, Carolina" as if offering a toast.

Notable people

People

In 2017, the university reported having over 300,000 living alumni.

Presidents

During its more than two hundred-year history, the university has had 28 presidents. The board of trustees announced the selection of Robert L. Caslen as the 29th president on July 19, 2019. Caslen's predecessor, Harris Pastides, served as the university's president from 2008 until 2019. After Caslen abruptly resigned in May 2021, Pastides returned as the institution's interim president while a new search for a permanent president was launched. Michael Amiridis, named 30th president on January 14, 2022, took office July 1, 2022.

Board of trustees

Since its charter in 1801, the university has been governed by a board of trustees, which now governs the entire University of South Carolina System.

Photo gallery

See also

 The First Year Experience Program
McMaster School

Notes

References

Further reading
Hollis, Daniel Walker, (1951) University of South Carolina Volume I South Carolina College, Columbia: University of South Carolina Press
Hollis, Daniel Walker, (1956) University of South Carolina Volume II College to University Columbia: University of South Carolina Press

External links

South Carolina Athletics website

 
University of South Carolina
University of South Carolina
Buildings and structures in Columbia, South Carolina
Buildings and structures with revolving restaurants
Education in Columbia, South Carolina
Flagship universities in the United States
Schools of public health in the United States
Universities and colleges accredited by the Southern Association of Colleges and Schools
Tourist attractions in Columbia, South Carolina
Educational institutions established in 1801
1801 establishments in South Carolina